Carlos Daniel Aimar (born 21 July 1950) is an Argentine retired footballer who played as a midfielder, and a current coach.

Playing career
Born in Corral de Bustos, Marcos Juárez, Córdoba, Aimar started his senior career with hometown's Sporting Club. In 1971, after impressing in a friendly, he moved to Rosario Central.

On 16 May 1971 Aimar made his Primera División debut, in a defeat against Estudiantes de La Plata. After making his debut, he was regularly used by the club, being a part of the squad in its 1971 and 1973 league-winning campaigns.

Aimar also appeared with Rosario in three Copa Libertadores editions, and ended his spell at the club in 1978 with a total of 334 matches and 32 goals. In 1979, he joined fellow league team San Lorenzo de Almagro, and eventually retired with the club in the end of the year, aged 28.

Managerial career
Aimar's first managerial experience was at Deportivo Español in 1988. The following year he moved abroad, being appointed manager of CD Logroñés in La Liga.

After a one-year spell at Boca Juniors, Aimar returned to his lifetime club Rosario Central in 1991. He subsequently returned to Logroñés, avoiding relegation during his two campaigns in charge.

In 1994 Aimar was appointed at the helm of Celta de Vigo, also in the top division. He was sacked in October 1995, and was later named manager of another club he represented as a player, San Lorenzo.

In 1997 Aimar returned to Logroñés for a third spell, but failed to avoid its top flight relegation. He was subsequently in charge of CD Tenerife, Club Atlético Lanús, CD Leganés and Quilmes Atlético Club before retiring from football and becoming a sports commentator.

Honours

Player
Rosario Central
Primera División: 1971, 1973

References

External links

Arriba Central profile 

1950 births
Living people
Sportspeople from Córdoba Province, Argentina
Argentine footballers
Association football midfielders
Argentine Primera División players
Rosario Central footballers
San Lorenzo de Almagro footballers
Argentine football managers
Deportivo Español managers
Boca Juniors managers
Rosario Central managers
San Lorenzo de Almagro managers
Club Atlético Lanús managers
Quilmes Atlético Club managers
La Liga managers
Segunda División managers
CD Logroñés managers
RC Celta de Vigo managers
CD Tenerife managers
CD Leganés managers
Argentine expatriate football managers
Argentine expatriate sportspeople in Spain
Expatriate football managers in Spain